Liocarpiloides is a genus of crabs in the family Xanthidae, containing the following species:

Liocarpilodes armiger (Nobili, 1905)
Liocarpilodes biunguis (Rathbun, 1906)
Liocarpiloides harmsi (Balss, 1934)
Liocarpiloides integerrimus (Dana, 1852)
Liocarpiloides pacificus Balss, 1938

References

Xanthoidea